David Long Jr. (born February 6, 1998) is an American football cornerback who is a free agent. He played college football at Michigan. As a junior at Michigan, he was a 2018 first-team (coaches) and third-team (media) All-Big Ten selection. He is known for his nickname as "The Hawk".

High school career
A native of Pasadena, Long attended Bishop Alemany High School his freshman year, before transferring to Loyola High School for the remainder of his high school career.

In July 2015, the Chicago Tribune reported that Long was considering local schools USC and UCLA as well as Michigan, Notre Dame, Wisconsin, Washington, Oregon, Stanford, Duke and Oklahoma for his collegiate football career. On August 2, 2015, Long was described as wavering between Stanford and Washington, but committed to Stanford on August 6.

Long, a 4.0 GPA student, became the first player to receive his jersey for the 2016 U.S. Army All-American Bowl on September 22, 2015. He decommitted from Stanford on December 18, and announced he was considering Washington and Michigan. He played in the U.S. Army All-American Bowl and was described as starting to lean toward Michigan by that time.  Michigan head coach Jim Harbaugh flew with four assistant coaches on January 18 and climbed a tree as part of his effort to recruit Long. Long committed to Michigan on January 21, 2016.

College career
Long graduated from high school with a 3.9 GPA and arrived at Michigan to be mentored by Jourdan Lewis. As a junior for the 2018 Michigan Wolverines, he was a 2018 All-Big Ten first-team (coaches) and third-team (media) selection. Following the season, he was considered to be a possible 2019 NFL Draft prospect.

Professional career

The Los Angeles Rams selected Long in the third round (79th overall) in the 2019 NFL Draft. In Super Bowl LVI, Long recorded 4 tackles in the 23-20 win against the Cincinnati Bengals.

References

External links
 Michigan Wolverines bio
  Los Angeles Rams bio
 Long Jr. at ESPN

1998 births
Living people
American football defensive backs
Michigan Wolverines football players
Players of American football from Los Angeles
Los Angeles Rams players